Salins may refer to the following people:
Arthur Guyot de Salins
Guigone de Salins (1403–1470), member of the nobility in Burgundy, France
Gunars Saliņš (1924–2010), Latvian modernist poet
Patrice Bailly-Salins (born 1964), French biathlete
Robert Lamezan de Salins (1869–1930), also known as Robert Graf von Lamezan-Salins while in Austrian service, a Polish and Austro-Hungarian military officer

See also
Salin (surname)